Egypt is a hamlet in the South Bucks district of Buckinghamshire, England. It is located within Farnham Royal civil parish, just to the north of Farnham Common, and on the edge of Burnham Beeches.

It is thought that the hamlet was so named because it was a common settling point for Romani travellers, and the term "gypsy" for such people derives from the Greek  (Aigyptioi), meaning Egyptian.

References

Hamlets in Buckinghamshire
Romani communities in the United Kingdom